The Shops at Wiregrass is an open-air lifestyle center in Wesley Chapel, Pasco County, Florida. In addition to free parking lots, valet parking, and a parking structure, there are streetside parking spaces at meters along its central street, Paseo Drive. The property's total size is 850,000 square feet (79,000 m2) of retail and restaurant space. The center currently features over 100 shops, including many popular restaurants and eateries, and a wide selection of clothing, shoe and health, and beauty stores for the entire family. The mall is anchored by Dillard's, Macy's, Barnes and Noble's, and J. C. Penney. In addition, the center is home to a growing number of nightlife venues. Regularly scheduled events are held at the development's Center Court, which also contains a children's play space and an outdoor moving train attraction. The Shops at Wiregrass opened in 2008.

References

External links
Shops at Wiregrass

Buildings and structures in Pasco County, Florida
Shopping malls in Florida
Shopping malls established in 2008
Tourist attractions in Pasco County, Florida